The 1912 International Lawn Tennis Challenge was the 11th edition of what is now known as the Davis Cup. After a six-year hiatus, France rejoined the competition; however, the United States pulled out of the competition. In the final, the British Isles regained the Cup from Australasia. The final was played at the Albert Ground in Melbourne, Australia on 28–30 November.

Draw

Notes
 1. The final was scratched and the British Isles were granted the right to play Australasia in the Challenge Round as the United States were unable to field a team.

Semifinal
British Isles vs. France

Challenge Round
Australasia vs. British Isles

References

External links
Davis Cup official website

Davis Cups by year
International Lawn Tennis Challenge
International Lawn Tennis Challenge
International Lawn Tennis Challenge